Corral Hollow Pass, originally Portezuela de Buenos Ayres (Pass of Good Winds) is a low mountain pass in the Diablo Range southeast of Livermore, in Alameda County, California.  This pass, at an elevation of 1600 ft, was the point where El Camino Viejo crested the range, leaving the Arroyo Seco watershed in the southeastern part of the Livermore Valley and dropping down a deep canyon into Corral Hollow near the former mining town of Tesla. The road then continued eastward along Corral Hollow Creek into the San Joaquin Valley.  Today County Hwy J2 (Tesla Road/Corral Hollow Road) follows this route. This is a popular alternate route to Interstate 580 during rush hour. 

The name Portezuela de Buenos Ayres appears on the Diseño del Rancho Las Positas.   Portezuela means "small door" in Spanish and in Mexico can mean "a pass between hills".  By 1873, the name of the pass had changed and appeared on a California State Geological Survey map as Corral Hollow Pass.

References

External links 
  Composite: Map Of The Region Adjacent To The Bay Of San Francisco, 1873 from www.davidrumsey.com accessed November 24, 2011. Shows name change to Corral Hollow Pass.

Mountain passes of California
Diablo Range
Livermore Valley
El Camino Viejo
History of Alameda County, California
Landforms of Alameda County, California